Bridgeport, Connecticut, held an election election for mayor on November 3, 2015. It saw former mayor Joseph Ganim return to the office. Ganim defeated incumbent mayor Bill Finch in the Democratic primary.

Democratic primary

The Democratic primary was held on September 16.

Heading into the election Ganim, a former mayor who had served jail time related to federal corruption charges, was seen as an underdog.

General election

References

2015
Bridgeport
Bridgeport